Legio X Equestris, a Roman legion, was levied by Julius Caesar in 61 BC when he was the Governor of Hispania Ulterior. The Tenth was the first legion levied personally by Caesar and was consistently his most trusted.  Legio X was famous in its day and throughout history, because of its portrayal in Caesar's Commentaries and the prominent role the Tenth played in his Gallic campaigns. Its soldiers were discharged in 45 BC. Its remnants were reconstituted, fought for Mark Antony and Octavian, disbanded, and later merged into X Gemina.

History

Founding

When Gaius Julius Caesar arrived as Governor in the province of Baetica or Hispania Ulterior (modern Andalusia), as it was in 61 BC, he immediately decided to subdue the west and northwest areas (modern day Portugal). He already had two legions based in the province, the 8th and 9th Legions, which had been enlisted by Gnaeus Pompeius Magnus (Pompey the Great) in 65 BC. Caesar needed a third legion for his planned campaign and so he immediately enlisted a new legion, the 10th Legion. Enlisted in March, the legion took as its emblem the bull, an emblem which proved popular with other legions such as Legio V Alaudae (Larks), Legio XI, Legio XII Victrix, and Legio XIII Gemina.

The campaign in the summer of 61 BC was very successful and the 10th Legion showed itself to be brave and loyal to Julius Caesar.

Gallic Wars and the invasion of Britain
The Tenth played a crucial part in the Gallic Wars, fighting under Caesar in virtually every battle.

At the beginning of the Gallic campaign, Caesar brought the 10th legion from Spain (with the 7th, 8th, and 9th legions). Almost immediately, in the summer of 58 BC, the legion fought in two major actions, the battles of Arar and Bibracte. They played a central part in Caesar's defeat of the Helvetii tribes, preventing their migration from present day Switzerland to western France.

Following the defeat of the Helvetii, the leaders of the Gallic tribes petitioned Caesar for his aid against Ariovistus, king of the German Suebi tribe.  Prior to battle, Ariovistus suggested a peace conference but insisted that each side should only be accompanied by mounted troops. Ariovistus made this a condition knowing that Caesar's cavalry was composed mainly of Aedui horsemen whose loyalty to Caesar was questionable. Caesar ordered a group of his Gallic auxiliaries to dismount and had legionaries from the 10th ride in their place to accompany him to the peace conference. This incident earned the legion its nickname Equestris (mounted). One of the legionaries jokingly said that Caesar was better than his word: he had promised to make them foot guards, but now they appeared as equestrians.

Legio X saved the day in the Battle against the Nervians in 57 BC. Together with the IXth, the Xth defeated the Atrebates, moved against the Belgae on the other side of the river and captured the enemy camp. From that position, the Tenth could see how desperate the situation was for the XII Victrix and the VII, so it quickly charged downhill, crossed the river, and attacked the Nervii from the rear, trapping them so that there was little hope of survival.

In 55 BC Legio X was one of the two legions (together with the VII) which took part in Caesar's first invasion of Britain. It is probable that it also participated in the second invasion in 54 BC.

Caesar's Civil War
During Caesar's Civil War, at the Battle of Dyrrhachium, Caesar feared Legio X would be outflanked by reinforcements led by Gnaeus Pompeius Magnus and ordered them to retreat. The rest of Caesar's army, seeing Legio X retreating for the first time, broke and fled to their camps. Legio X, seeing the army rout, fled too. After the defeat, Legio X's officers demanded to be decimated for cowardice but Caesar was reluctant and demoted Legio X's standard bearers instead.

Legio X only had one more battle to restore their reputation before they returned to Rome and mutinied for being unpaid.

End of the legion
In 45 BC the legion was disbanded, and the veterans obtained lands in Narbonne, southern Gaul.

During the civil war that followed Caesar's assassination, the Legio X was reconstituted by Lepidus (winter 44/43), and fought for the triumvirs until the final Battle of Philippi. The veterans obtained lands near Cremona, and an inscription reports that the name of the legion at the time was Veneria, "devoted to Venus", the mythical mother of gens Julia.

The Tenth later followed Mark Antony in Armenia, during his disastrous Parthian campaign. During Antony's civil war, the legion fought for Mark Antony until the defeat in the Battle of Actium, after which the legion moved into Octavian's army. The veterans settled in Patras. When the legion rebelled under Augustus, it was disbanded, stripped of its Equestris title, and, being populated with soldiers from other legions, renamed X Gemina.

See also

 List of Roman legions

Notes

References

Primary sources
Julius Caesar, De Bello Gallico

Secondary sources
 Dando-Collins, Stephen (2002), Caesar's Legion: The Epic Saga of Julius Caesar's Elite Tenth Legion and the Armies of Rome, Wiley.
 Keppie, Lawrence (1984), The Making of the Roman Army. From Republic to Empire, University of Oklahoma Press, pp. 132–149.
 Lendering, Jona, "Legio X Gemina", livius.org
 Phang, Sara Elise (2008).  Roman Military Service: ideologies of discipline in the Late Republic and early Principate, Cambridge University Press.
 Soden, Ben (2015). 10th Legion: Battle Born. Bellum Books.
 Ritterling's "Legio" "Legio X Veneria" 

10 Equestris
Military units and formations established in the 1st century BC